Lac Besson is a lake in Isère, France.

Besson